Lentas (Greek Λέντας), Lentas is a coastal village 75 km south of Heraklion, on the south coast of Crete in Greece. It belongs to the community of Miamou within the municipality of Gortyna.

Origins of the name
The name of Lentas possibly derives from the Greek word Λέοντας (in English, "lion"). It refers to the lion-shaped cape that makes the small protected bay of Lentas. This cape is documented in medieval maps as Cape Liontas (Greek Ακρ. Λιώντας).

Climate
It belongs to an area where the climate consists of an exception in accordance to the climate on the island of Crete is a mediterranean climate. Lentas falls in the North African climatic zone and thus enjoys significantly more sunny days and high temperatures during the summer. Probably the best time to visit Lentas is spring and autumn.

History 
Lentas has been inhabited since the Neolithic and Early Minoan period (3rd millennium BC). Lentas was one of the two harbours of Gortyn, which became the most prominent city of Crete after the fall of Knossos. At the beginning of the 4th century BC, the Gortynians established a sanctuary of Asclepius at the harbour. An earthquake in 46 BC destroyed the city, but it was subsequently rebuilt. Gortyn became the capital of the province during the Roman era, which also comprised Cyrenaica (now eastern Libya). It is believed that Leben became a sanatorium where sick wealthy Romans, mainly from North Africa, received treatment. The treatment consisted of a diet with mineral water from an ancient spring near the temple of Asklepios, which was believed to have therapeutic properties and local fruits. In the early Christian and Byzantine periods, a small settlement developed and a basilica was erected. The small Byzantine church of St. John was built in the 14th century. 

The archaeological investigation of the site started after the first visit of the English captain H. Spratt, in the middle of the 19th century. Excavations were carried out by the Italian Archaeological School at Athens in 1900, 1910, and 1912–13, and revealed the sanctuary and other buildings. Since then no excavation had taken place in the ancient city until recent years when the investigations of the Greek Archaeological Service brought to light the Minoan settlement and graves. The archaeological area comprises the sanctuary of Asclepius and the Byzantine church of St John. 

Today Lentas is a popular tourist destination and has rural and stock farming activities.

External links 

Official Website lentas.gr
Weather Forecast for Lentas

Populated places in Heraklion (regional unit)
Port settlements in ancient Crete
Religion in ancient Crete
Temples of Asclepius